On the Air  is an American television sitcom created by Mark Frost and David Lynch. It was broadcast from June 20 to July 4, 1992 on the American Broadcasting Company (ABC). The series follows the staff of a fictional 1950s television network, Zoblotnick Broadcasting Company (ZBC), as they produce a live variety program called The Lester Guy Show—often with disastrous results. On the Air was produced by Lynch/Frost Productions and followed Lynch and Frost's previous series, Twin Peaks. In the United States only three of the seven filmed episodes were aired, but the first-and-only season was broadcast in its entirety in the United Kingdom and several other European countries.

The series stars Ian Buchanan, Marla Rubinoff, Nancye Ferguson, Miguel Ferrer, Gary Grossman, Mel Johnson Jr., Marvin Kaplan, David L. Lander, Kim McGuire and Tracey Walter. On the Air featured several directors, including co-creator David Lynch, Lesli Linka Glatter, Jonathan Sanger, Jack Fisk and Betty Thomas; Lynch, Glatter and Sanger had previously directed episodes of Twin Peaks.

Discussing the show, Lynch said that "Absurdity is what I like most in life, and there’s humor in struggling in ignorance. If you saw a man repeatedly running into a wall until he was a bloody pulp, after a while it would make you laugh because it becomes absurd. But I don’t just find humor in unhappiness – I find it extremely heroic the way people forge on despite the despair they often feel."

Characters
 Lester Guy (Ian Buchanan) – a washed-up movie star who stayed stateside during World War II and made a name for himself because every Hollywood leading man was off fighting the war. Star of The Lester Guy Show. Put on the air after Zoblotnik Broadcasting Corporation Network President Bud Budwaller discovered him drinking vodka from a frozen orange juice can in West Hollywood, and gave him the comeback break opportunity of a lifetime. Though the star of The Lester Guy Show, Lester Guy is outshone by supporting actress Betty Hudson, simply because he cares more about his own popularity than being the entertainer he is supposed to be. In the sixth episode Lester finds a graphic sketch of a logo for The Betty Hudson Show with Lester Guy, and is devastated. Lester Guy spends every waking moment either "down town" or plotting a way to make himself more popular than Betty... or to make Betty less popular than himself. He frequently winds up with a head injury. It seems that he is immortal because, in the first episode, while his ankles are tied, he is lifted by a rope and flung through a solid wall. In the fourth episode he is launched from a prop electric chair up to a backstage catwalk.
 Betty Hudson (Marla Rubinoff) – is an ingenue. She has no acting experience, and although not terribly bright, she is unfailingly sweet and earnest. Betty quickly wins a tremendous fan base because, in her mind, "the birds sing a pretty song and there's always music in the air," and she uses that to express her simple gentleness unto the American public. They love her for it. She becomes America's Sweetheart, and overshadows Lester Guy who feels threatened by her. In the pilot episode, we learn that Betty always carries her music box with her, for good luck, when she sings a song called "The Bird in the Tree" which uses the same music box tune as "The Mister Peanuts Song" and "Falling". She loves Chiclets gum. Her mother's name is Mary; her father, deceased, is named Noel; she has a sister who is a very famous actress and one of the pioneers of television, named Sylvia, and an uncle named Doodles; Betty names a duck after him.
 Bud Budwaller (Miguel Ferrer) – Zoblotnik Broadcasting Corporation Network President. He discovered washed-up actor Lester Guy drinking vodka from a frozen orange juice can in West Hollywood, and immediately recognized that he could control this person. Budwaller knew of network owner Mr. Zoblotnik's love of Lester Guy's work in a WWII-era musical: "Piccadilly Circus". Budwaller, hoping for a promotion, introduced Zoblotnik to his hero from the musical, Lester Guy. As The Lester Guy Show progresses, and America grows more and more fond of Betty Hudson, Budwaller fears that he may lose his job because he thinks Betty will ruin the show or take it over, showing Budwaller's ineptitude in understanding the audience. Bud Budwaller has "nothing but contempt for insubordination from so far down the food chain," and feels superior to his audience. He tries to control them through the show and even makes two understudy appearances on the fourth episode while special guest: Stan Tailings is having a coughing fit. In that instance, though Budwaller has last week's script, the dialog is essentially the same as this week's and he is able to convey actual meaning through the delivery of incorrect dialog.
 Nicole Thorne (Kim McGuire) – Zoblotnik Broadcasting Corporation Head of Comedy. She worries that if The Lester Guy Show fails she will lose her job, and goes along with Lester Guy and Bud Budwaller's plans to "break" Betty. After the fifth episode she becomes sycophantically devoted to Lester. She hyperventilates, and people make fun of her for it. In the sixth episode she hyperventilates nine breaths as backstage workers laugh and count her wheezes, and Lester stands behind her holding up the nine of hearts. She shouts at her subordinates: "How dare you laugh at me? I am the head of comedy for this network!" She wears sexy underwear.
 Dwight McGonigle (Marvin Kaplan) – Producer of The Lester Guy Show, he is the casting genius who discovered Betty. From so far away she called to him, and he found her and trained her, and brought her to appear on The Lester Guy Show. McGonigle suffers from hay-fever and is given an antihistamine that transfers his personality into Snaps the dog, Snaps the dog into him, and then it transfers Mrs. Thissle into him. Water breaks the "spell". We can tell that McGonigle is a trans-dimensional entity because when he is flustered he finds himself being pulled away from reality into a world that lies beyond his own distant hand, and he recites: "From so far away she calls to me." We can tell he is immortal because in the third episode while experiencing hay fever he sneezes and falls into an office chair that rolls back at a very high speed and slams him into the steel frame of a set dressing. He sits up unharmed. McGonigle shares his name with William McGonagall, considerably the worst poet ever.
 Valdja Gochktch (David L. Lander) – Mr. Zoblotnick's nephew, from the old country, and director of The Lester Guy Show. He speaks English with a near-incomprehensible accent, and has a penchant for shoes and mink oil. His use of a megaphone is never correct. He lives in abject fear of Bud Budwaller.
 Ruth Trueworthy (Nancye Ferguson) – production assistant(go-fer) on The Lester Guy Show. She is also the assistant director because she is the only person who can understand Mister Gotchktch. Her secondary job is translating his bad English into straightforward English. In the fourth episode she translates his bad English for a Mexican mariachi band, the Cinqua Quartet, and there is no indication they understand a word she says. She seems intent on helping Betty.
 Bert Schein (Gary Grossman) – an actor who performs supporting roles on The Lester Guy Show. He is very good at what he does unless he gets flustered. In the first episode he is constantly reminded of his cue, Betty's scream, even though he already knows it. This helps distract the high tragedy of the Kitchen Scene into humoresque tragedy. In the second episode, Bert imitates a mad dog, and finds himself obsessed with ducks. In the fifth episode he takes it upon himself to dress in drag in an effort to save a failing skit only to find that he had no reason to because Betty and a talking piece of wood without an upper lip had already had the same idea. In the seventh episode he is discovered wearing a gas mask in a room filled with ducks, reciting poetry to them.
 Billy "Blinky" Watts (Tracey Walter) – master sound effects technician for The Lester Guy Show. He suffers from "Bozeman's Simplex," a disease that causes him to see 25.62 times more than everyone else. We are frequently reminded that Blinky is not blind but sees more. Blinky's ability to see more lets him help his good friend Mickey with his work.
 Mickey (Mel Johnson, Jr.) – visual effects supervisor on The Lester Guy Show and a good friend to Blinky Watts. In the second episode he has designed and built a prop bugging device that also dispenses visual effect knock out gas. The gas makes those who inhale it laugh and feel stupid. His ability to see everything clear lets him help his good friend Blinky with his work.
 Shorty (Irwin Keyes) – a stagehand who is a giant, and apparently immortal. In the seventh episode he falls from a great height and lands on his face. He stands, says, "Oops," and walks away. In the fifth episode he is working a machined door engine that catches on to Nicole's dress, and tears it off; it also causes the mechanical door to slam shut in Sylvia Hudson's face.
 The Hurry Up Twins (Raleigh Friend and Raymond Friend) – a pair of conjoined twins who wear a two-necked sweater at all times. Except during actual performances of The Lester Guy Show, they walk around the stage and set, to everyone who is working and reminds them that their work must be completed soon, saying, "Hurry up," over and over.
 Snaps the Dog – a canine actor introduced in the first episode as the reluctant 'spokesdog' for The Lester Guy Show sponsor: Welby Snap's brand dog food. He subsequently becomes a regular cast member and has his own little adventures throughout the entire series. He is strangled by a handler who tries to force-feed him dog food, trades personalities with McGonigle, eats a wire attached to an important prop while it is in use, falls in love with a Pomeranian that spurns him and she is later run over by a red carpet, exists in most of what Blinky seems to see, and plays the bongos. In the fourth episode we learn that he also has his own dressing room.
The American Public – the audience for The Lester Guy Show. In every episode, except the second, we see the audience, and are shown that these people would watch the show no matter what it presented—as in the fifth episode where Sylvia Hudson tries to take the reins from Betty. The audience wouldn't have liked it but they would have watched it just the same—but they enjoy watching Betty. In the second episode Betty receives cards, telegrams, flowers, gifts, and accolades from all across America. In the third episode Lester receives a piece of fan mail that reads: "Since you are on the show and see her a lot, could you get Betty Hudson's autograph for me?" These people decide what they like and Bud Budwaller tries to control them by making them think they like what he offers them, but it is Betty, of course, who they admire because she doesn't seem to have to work at entertaining. America is simply entertained by her.

Episodes

Reception 
When it first aired, Ken Tucker of Entertainment Weekly gave it a positive B+ review, writing, "On the Air is a one-joke sitcom that makes explicit the message that... TV is stupid, and people will watch anything. Its undisguised contempt is pretty enthralling."

In 2008, Keith Phipps of The A.V. Club wrote: "On the Air is filled with endearing characters and memorably odd touches."

On 2017, Daniel Kurland of Den of Geek wrote that "On the Air’s pilot is its strongest episode […] the content slowly goes downhill as the show continues. This isn’t exactly unexpected, as other writers tried to play with the pilot’s strong voice and fumbled under the pressure, but you’re still getting something uniquely different every week, and that should be exciting in itself. There is a degree of joy and surprise around this comedy that is sorely absent from the majority of TV these days."

International broadcasts
All seven episodes were aired from 1st August 1990 in the United Kingdom by BBC2, in Italy by Telemontecarlo, in the Netherlands by VPRO, in Sweden by SVT, in Finland by MTV3, in Poland by TVP2 and in France by Canal Jimmy. At least four episodes were aired in Canada. The entire run was aired in Australia on The Comedy Channel through the Foxtel cable TV provider. Some episodes have been aired by the Bulgarian Nova Television.

References

External links

1990s American single-camera sitcoms
1990s American workplace comedy television series
1992 American television series debuts
1992 American television series endings
American Broadcasting Company original programming
English-language television shows
Metafictional television series
Television series about actors
Television series about television
Television series set in the 1950s
Television shows set in New York City
Television series created by David Lynch
Television series created by Mark Frost